Rimulanax is a genus of sea snails, marine gastropod mollusks in the family Fissurellidae, the keyhole limpets and slit limpets.

This genus is a taxon inquerendum and is possibly a synonym of Puncturella. Cunha et al. 2019 sequenced material of Puncturella aff. corolla and this clustered within Puncturella suggesting that Rimulanax is not distinct from Puncturella and that it is referable to the Zeidorinae.

Species
Species within the genus Rimulanax include:
 Rimulanax aethiopica (E. von Martens, 1902)
 Rimulanax corolla (Verco, 1908)

References

External links
 Herbert D.G. (2015). An annotated catalogue and bibliography of the taxonomy, synonymy and distribution of the Recent Vetigastropoda of South Africa (Mollusca). Zootaxa. 4049(1): 1-98

Fissurellidae